Sir Samuel Henry Strong  (August 13, 1825 – August 31, 1909) was a lawyer and the third Chief Justice of Canada.

Life
Strong was born in Poole, England, to Samuel Spratt Strong and Jane Elizabeth Gosse. He emigrated to Upper Canada with his family in 1836, settling in Bytown (later known as Ottawa). He studied law in the office of local Ottawa lawyer Augustus Keefer. He was called to the bar in 1849 and established his practice in Toronto. He was elected a bencher of the Law Society of Upper Canada in 1860 and was made a QC in 1863. In 1869, Strong was appointed vice-chancellor of the Court of Chancery of Ontario. In 1874 he was appointed to the Ontario Court of Error and Appeal. 

Following Confederation he advised Prime Minister Sir John A. Macdonald on the establishment of the Supreme Court of Canada. He was named to the new court when it was created in 1875. He became Chief Justice in 1892 serving until his retirement in 1902, by which time he was the last of the original justices remaining. He died in 1909 at the age of 84 and was buried in Ottawa's Beechwood Cemetery.

References

 Supreme Court of Canada Biography
 

1825 births
1909 deaths
Canadian Knights Bachelor
Canadian King's Counsel
Chief justices of Canada
Justices of the Supreme Court of Canada
English emigrants to pre-Confederation Ontario
Canadian members of the Privy Council of the United Kingdom
Members of the Judicial Committee of the Privy Council
People from Poole
Immigrants to Upper Canada